Thomas Abercrombie may refer to:

 Thomas A. Abercrombie (1951–2019), professor of anthropology at New York University
 Thomas Abercrombie (basketball) (born 1987), New Zealand basketball player
 Thomas J. Abercrombie (1930–2006), American adventurer, photographer and writer for National Geographic